Curry rice may refer to:
, a type of Japanese curry
Nasi kari, a rice dish from Indonesia
Rice and curry, a popular dish in the Southern Indian states of Andhra Pradesh, Karnataka, Kerala, and Tamil Nadu, as well as in Sri Lanka and Bangladesh